Thomas Griffitts (1698 – 10 December 1746) was Mayor of Philadelphia on three occasions and judge of the Supreme Court of Pennsylvania.

Griffitts was born in Cork, Ireland, the son of George and Frances Griffitts. He was a Quaker. He emigrated from Ireland in 1716, arriving in Philadelphia via Kingston, Jamaica.

He was a provincial councillor from 1733 to 1742. He was Mayor of Philadelphia in 1729–1731, 1733–1734, and 1737–1738. He also served as Judge of the Supreme Court of Pennsylvania from 1739 to 1743.

Griffitts married Mary Norris, daughter of Isaac Norris, in 1717. They had four children, one of them Hannah Griffitts, but none left surviving issue. He died in Philadelphia in 1746.

References

1698 births
1746 deaths
Irish Quakers
People from Cork (city)
Mayors of Philadelphia
Irish emigrants to the United States
Date of birth missing
Justices of the Supreme Court of Pennsylvania
People of colonial Pennsylvania
American Quakers